Temple Emanuel is a Reform Jewish synagogue in Beaumont, Texas.

The congregation was founded in  September 1895, and erected its first building in 1901. This wooden building in Neo-Byzantine style design was replaced by the congregation's current brick building in 1923.

Particularly notable are the congregation's set of six  windows, each 16-feet high, designed by Ze'ev Raban.  The windows were commissioned from Raban in 1922 by Rabbi Samuel Rosinger.     Each  window depicts an  event in the life of one of the principal Hebrew prophets,  Jeremiah, Elijah, Elisha, Ezekiel, Moses, and Isaiah.

External links
 http://www.emanuelbeaumont.org/

References

Buildings and structures in Beaumont, Texas
Byzantine Revival architecture in Texas
Byzantine Revival synagogues
Reform synagogues in Texas
Religious organizations established in 1895
Synagogues completed in 1923
1895 establishments in Texas
Synagogues completed in 1901